Malanje is a province of Angola. It has an area of 97,602 km² and a 2014 census population of 986,363. Malanje is the provincial capital.

Geography
It is bordered to the northwest by Uige Province, to the northeast by the Democratic Republic of the Congo, to the east by Lunda Norte Province and Lunda Sul Province, to the south by Bié Province and Cuanza Sul Province, and in the west by Cuanza Norte Province. The extreme north of the province is covered with savannah, while the southern part is largely dry savannah. The main rivers are the Cuanza River in the southwest and Kwango River in the northeast, and there is a mountainous area known as the Malanje Plateau.
The Cuije River and Cuanza flow in the vicinity of Cangandala National Park.
Large areas north and southeast of the city of Malanje have been declared protected areas. Of note is the Milando Reserve Park (Reserva Especial do Milando) in the north and the Reserva Natural Integral do Luando at the headwaters of Cuanza.

Municipalities
The province of Malanje consists of fourteen municipalities:

 Cacuso
 Calandula
 Cambundi-Catembo
 Cangandala
 Caombo
 Cuaba Nzoji
 Kunda-dia-Base
 Luquembo
 Malanje
 Marimba
 Massango
 Mucari
 Quela
 Quirima

Communes
The province of Malanje contains the following 66 communes; sorted by their respective municipalities:

 Cacuso Municipality: – Cacuso, Lombe, Pungo-Andongo, Quizenga (Kizenga), Soqueco (Sokeko)
 Calandula Municipality: – Calandula, Cateco-Cangola (Kateco-Kangola), Cota (Kota), Cuale, Quinje
 Cambundi-Catembo Municipality: – Cambundi-Catembo, Dumba Cambango, Quitapa, Tala Mungongo
 Cangandala Municipality: – Bembo, Cangandala, Caribo (Karibo), Culamagia
 Caombo Municipality: – Bange-Angola, Cambo Suinginge, Caombo, Micanda
 Cuaba Nzoji Municipality: – Cuaba Nzoji, Mufuma
 Kunda-dia-Base Municipality: – Kunda-dia-Base (Cunda-dia-Baze), Lemba, Milando
 Luquembo Municipality: – Capunda, Cunga Palanga, Dombo, Luquembo, Quimbango, Rimba
 Malanje Municipality: – Cambaxe (Kambaxe), Malanje, Ngola-Luije (Nugola-Luije)
 Marimba Municipality: – Cabombo-Lumai, Marimba, Tembo-Aluma
 Massango Municipality: – Massango, Quihuhu, Quinguengue
 Mucari Municipality: – Catala, Caxinga, Mucari-Caculama, Muquixe (Mikixi)
 Quela Municipality: – Bângalas (Missão dos Bangalas), Moma, Quela, Xandele
 Quirima Municipality: – Quirima, Sautar

Economy

The province is predominantly agricultural. The most intensively used area in the province of Malanje is the area around the provincial capital, where cotton and sugarcane are the most important industries. The cotton industry was once of vital importance to the national economy, but the years of the Angola Civil War have badly stagnated it. Agriculture in Malanje Province is gradually taking off again, and numerous international investors have been involved, including US$30 million from Brazil to develop the maize and sugarcane industry in the Pungo Andongo area. Malanje Province is also a producer of cassava, sweet potatoes, peanuts, rice, soybeans, sunflowers and various vegetables. The province also has significant reserves of diamonds, limestone, manganese (with 4,682 metric tons exported in 1973), uranium and phosphate.

Tourism has become more important, largely due to its diverse natural attractions, including the Kalandula Falls, the black rock formation of Pungo Andongo, two nature reserves and the Cangandala National Park. Cangandala National Park, the smallest national park in the country, was originally established under Portuguese rule in 1963 to protect the Giant Sable Antelope, before being declared a national park on 25 June 1970.

List of governors of Malanje

References

External links

 Official website of province governor
 Information on this province at the Angolan ministry for territorial administration
 Information on this province at Info Angola
 British website (Angola.uk.org) on Malanje province
 Province geographical info at geoview.info

 
Provinces of Angola